Agrobank is a Malaysian government-owned Bank under the purview of the Minister of Finance Incorporated, established in 1969 with focus on agriculture sector.   The Bank's financing of the agricultural sector is driven by a policy set forth by the Ministry of Agriculture and Food Industries (MAFI).

As a DFI (Development Financial Institution) that focus on strengthening the agriculture sector in Malaysia, Agrobank aims to balance its developmental and commercial roles to benefit the agriculture sector. Agrobank provides a comprehensive financing solution for agriculture; that includes upstream activities such as the supply of agricultural production inputs to downstream activities such as processing and selling of agricultural products to consumers

With more than 49 years of experience, Agrobank is actively shaping the country's agricultural development across eight (8) regions it operates, via 184 branches; offering products and services in the areas of corporate, commercial and micro financing as well as trade finance, personal financing, electronic banking and deposit & services.

On 1 July 2015, Agrobank has become a full-fledged Islamic bank.

References

External links
 

1969 establishments in Malaysia
Ministry of Agriculture and Food Industries (Malaysia)
Agro
Government-owned companies of Malaysia
Agricultural organisations based in Malaysia
Banks established in 1969
Malaysian companies established in 1969
Development finance institutions
Minister of Finance (Incorporated) (Malaysia)
Privately held companies of Malaysia
Agriculture companies established in 1969